Henry Fairfield Osborn, Sr.  (August 8, 1857 – November 6, 1935) was an American paleontologist, geologist and eugenics advocate. He was the president of the American Museum of Natural History for 25 years and a cofounder of the American Eugenics Society.

Early life and education

Family 
Henry Fairfield Osborn was born in Fairfield, Connecticut on August 8, 1857, in a family of distinction. He was the eldest son of shipping magnate and railroad tycoon William Henry Osborn and Virginia Reed (née Sturges) Osborn.  

His maternal grandparents were Jonathan Sturges, a prominent New York businessman and arts patron who was a direct descendant of Jonathan Sturges, a U.S. Representative from Connecticut, and Mary Pemberton Cady, a direct descendant of prominent educator Ebenezer Pemberton. His maternal aunt Amelia Sturges, was the first wife of J. P. Morgan, but died of tuberculosis soon after their wedding.

His younger brother was William Church Osborn, who served as president of the Metropolitan Museum of Art, and married philanthropist and social reformer Alice Clinton Hoadley Dodge, a daughter of William E. Dodge Jr.

Education 
From 1873 to 1877, Osborn studied at Princeton University, obtaining a B.A. in geology and archaeology, where he was mentored by paleontologist Edward Drinker Cope. Two years later, Osborn took a special course of study in anatomy in the College of Physicians and Surgeons and Bellevue Medical School of New York under Dr. William H. Welch, and subsequently studied embryology and comparative anatomy under Thomas Huxley as well as Francis Maitland Balfour at Cambridge University, England.

In 1880, Osborn obtained a Sc.D. in paleontology from Princeton, becoming a lecturer in Biology and Professor of Comparative Anatomy from the same university between 1883 and 1890.

Career

In 1891, Osborn was hired by Columbia University as a professor of zoology; simultaneously, he accepted a position at the American Museum of Natural History, New York, where he served as the curator of a newly formed Department of Vertebrate Paleontology.

Fossil hunting 
As a curator, he assembled a remarkable team of fossil hunters and preparators, including William King Gregory; Roy Chapman Andrews and Barnum Brown, commonly referred to as Mr Bones, a possible inspiration for the creation of the fictional archeologist Indiana Jones; and Charles R. Knight, who made murals of dinosaurs in their habitats and sculptures of the living creatures. 
Long a member of the US Geological Survey, Osborn became its senior vertebrate paleontologist in 1924.  He led many fossil-hunting expeditions into the American Southwest, starting with his first to Colorado and Wyoming in 1877. Osborn conducted research on Tyrannosaurus brains by cutting open fossilized braincases with a diamond saw. (Modern researchers use computed tomography scans and 3D reconstruction software to visualize the interior of dinosaur endocrania without damaging valuable specimens.) 

On November 23, 1897, he was elected member of the Boone and Crockett Club, a wildlife conservation organization founded by Theodore Roosevelt and George Bird Grinnell.  Thanks to his considerable family wealth and personal connections, he succeeded Morris K. Jesup as the president of the museum's Board of Trustees in 1908, serving until 1933, during which time he accumulated one of the finest fossil collections in the world. 

Additionally, Osborn served as president of the New York Zoological Society from 1909 to 1925.

He was elected as a member to the American Philosophical Society in 1886. He accumulated a number of prizes for his work in paleontology. In 1901, Osborn was elected a Fellow of the American Academy of Arts and Sciences. He described and named Ornitholestes in 1903, Tyrannosaurus rex and Albertosaurus in 1905, Pentaceratops in 1923, and Velociraptor in 1924. 

In 1929 Osborn was awarded the Daniel Giraud Elliot Medal from the National Academy of Sciences.

American Museum of Natural History 
His legacy at the American Museum has proved more enduring. Biographer Ronald Rainger has described Osborn as "a first-rate science administrator and a third-rate scientist." Indeed, Osborn's greatest contributions to science ultimately lay in his efforts to popularize it through visual means. At his urging, staff members at the American Museum of Natural History invested new energy in display, and the museum became one of the pre-eminent sites for exhibition in the early twentieth century as a result. The murals, habitat dioramas, and dinosaur mounts executed during his tenure at the museum attracted millions of visitors, and inspired other museums to imitate his innovations. But his decision to invest heavily in exhibition also alienated certain members of the scientific community and angered curators hoping to spend more time on their own research. Additionally, his efforts to imbue the museum's exhibits and educational programs with his own racist and eugenist beliefs disturbed many of his contemporaries and have marred his legacy.

Theories

Dawn Man Theory
Osborn developed his own evolutionary theory of human origins called the "Dawn Man Theory". His theory was founded on the discovery of Piltdown Man (Eoanthropus) which was dated to the Late (Upper) Pliocene. Writing before Piltdown was exposed as a hoax, the Eoanthropus or "Dawn Man" Osborn maintained sprang from a common ancestor with the ape during the Oligocene period which he believed developed entirely separately during the Miocene (16 million years ago). Therefore, Osborn argued that all apes (Simia, following the pre-Darwinian classification of Linnaeus) had evolved entirely parallel to the ancestors of man (homo). Osborn himself wrote:

While believing in common ancestry between man and ape, Osborn denied that this ancestor was ape-like. The common ancestor between man and ape Osborn always maintained was more human than ape. Writing to Arthur Keith in 1927, he remarked "when our Oligocene ancestor is found it will not be an ape, but it will be surprisingly pro-human". His student William K. Gregory called Osborn's idiosyncratic view on man's origins as a form of "Parallel Evolution", but many creationists misinterpreted Osborn, greatly frustrating him, and believed he was asserting humankind had never evolved from a lower life form.

Evolutionary views
Osborn was originally a supporter of Edward Drinker Cope's neo-Lamarckism, however he later abandoned this view. Osborn became a proponent of organic selection, also known as the Baldwin effect.

Osborn was a believer in orthogenesis; he coined the term aristogenesis for his theory. His aristogenesis was based on a "physicochemical approach" to evolution. He believed that aristogenes operate as biomechanisms in the geneplasm of the organism. He also held the view that mutations and natural selection play no creative role in evolution and that aristogenesis was the origin of new novelty. Osborn equated this struggle for evolutionary advancement with the striving for spiritual salvation, thereby combining his biological and spiritual viewpoints.

Eugenics 

Osborn, who cofounded the American Eugenics Society in 1922, advocated a view not uncommon in circles of the upper classes at that time, that heredity is superior to influences from the environment. As an extension of this, he accepted that distinct races existed with fixed hereditary traits, and held the Nordic or Anglo-Saxon "race" to be highest. Osborn therefore supported eugenics to preserve "good" racial stock. Due to this, he endorsed Madison Grant's The Passing of the Great Race, writing both the second and fourth prefaces of the book, which argued for such views. The book was also largely influential on Adolf Hitler. Hitler called the book 'his bible' for it advocated a rigid system of selection through the elimination of those who, according to the writer's opinion are to be seen as 'weak' or 'unfit'.

Personal life

In June 1881, Osborn was married to writer Lucretia Thatcher Perry (1858–1930) at the military chapel on Governors Island. She was the daughter of Brigadier General Alexander James Perry and Josephine (Adams) Perry, and a descendant of Justice Christopher Raymond Perry).  Lucretia's sister, Josephine Adams Perry, was the wife of banker Junius Spencer Morgan II. Thatcher Perry had five children with Osborn, one of whom died in childhood:
 Virginia Sturges Osborn (1882–1955), married firstly Ralph Sanger (1882–1918); married secondly Robert Gordon McKay (1877–1958).
 Fairfield Osborn Sanger (1907–1917)
 Alexander Perry Osborn (1884–1951), a lawyer and banker who married secondly Marie Cantrell (1903–1988). His first marriage was to Anne Maynadier Steele (1894–1977), and resulted in a divorce.
 Alexander Perry Osborn Jr. (1917–1974), married Marion Lawrence (1918–2010), a great-great-granddaughter of Abbott Lawrence and twice-divorced mother of four. Her first marriage was to Robert B. Cutler.
 Alexander Perry Osborn III (1955–2008)
 Alexander Perry Osborn IV
 Gary Wayne Osborn
 David Eugene Osborn
 Henry Fairfield Osborn Jr. (1887–1969), known as Fairfield Osborn, naturalist and conservationist who married Marjorie Mary Lamond (1892–1989).
 Josephine Adams Osborn (1890–1976), who married James "Jay" Coogan Jr. (1886–1974).
 Rhoda Gordon Coogan (1923–2000), married Charles Cary (1916–1985), the son of George Cary and great-grandson of Trumbull Cary and Thomas C. Love.
 Trumbull Cary (b. 1952), married Eleanor Lamont Cunningham (b. 1959), a descendant of Edward Burnett and James Russell Lowell.
 Nicholas Cunningham Cary (b. 1993)
 Medeleine Lamont Cary (b. 1996)
 William Cromwell Cary (b. 1996)
 Gurdon Saltonstall Osborn (1895–1896), who died young.

After his father's death in 1894, Osborn inherited his Rhenish style home, Castle Rock, in Garrison, New York in the Hudson Highlands, which his father had purchased in 1859, and where he concentrated on his philanthropy after his 1882 retirement.  After his mother's death in 1902, the remainder of his parents' estate was equally divided between Henry and his brother William.

Following an "illness of nearly a year", his wife died at their country home in August 1930. Osborn died suddenly on November 6, 1935, in his study at Castle Rock, overlooking the Hudson River.

Eponyms
The dinosaur Saurolophus osborni was named after Osborn by Barnum Brown in 1912.

An African dwarf crocodile, Osteolaemus osborni, was named in his honor by Karl Patterson Schmidt in 1919.

Published books
 From the Greeks to Darwin: An Outline of the Development of the Evolution Idea (1894)
 Present Problems in Evolution and Heredity (1892)
 Evolution of Mammalian Molar Teeth: To and From the Triangular Type (1907)
 Men of the Old Stone Age: Their Environment Life and Art (1915)
 The Origin and Evolution of Life (1916)
 Men of the Old Stone Age (1916)
 The Age of Mammals in Europe, Asia and North America (1921)
 Evolution and Religion (1923)
 Evolution And Religion In Education (1926)
 Man Rises to Parnassus', Critical Epochs in the Pre-History of Man (1927)
 Aristogenesis, the Creative Principle in the Origin of Species (1934)

See also
 "The New Museum Idea"

References

Works cited
 
 
 Larsson, H.C.E., 2001. Endocranial Anatomy of Carcharodontosaurus saharicus. In D.H. Tanke & K. Carpenter (eds.), Mesozoic Vertebrate Life: pp. 19–33.

Further reading
 
 
 Robertson, Thomas, "Total War and the Total Environment: Fairfield Osborn, William Vogt, and the Birth of Global Ecology," Environmental History, 17 (April 2012), 336–64.
  (Madison Grant was a friend and collaborator of Osborn)
 National Academy of Sciences: Biographical Memoir of Henry Fairfield Osborn (1857–1935), by William K. Gregory, 1937

External links

 Bibliography of the published writings of Henry Fairfield Osborn for the years 1877-1915
 Brief essay on Osborn's racial theories
 brief biographical sketch
 
 
 

1857 births
1935 deaths
20th-century American scientists
American conservationists
American eugenicists
American geologists
American paleontologists
Columbia University faculty
Fellows of the American Academy of Arts and Sciences
Foreign Members of the Royal Society
Members of the United States National Academy of Sciences
Orthogenesis
People associated with the American Museum of Natural History
People from Fairfield, Connecticut
Recipients of the Cullum Geographical Medal
 
United States Geological Survey personnel
Wildlife Conservation Society people
Wollaston Medal winners
Members of the American Philosophical Society